Jessica Córes (born 19 October 1990) is a Brazilian actress. She is best known for her roles in Rede Globo's telenovela Verdades Secretas, and in Netflix's series Invisible City.

Career 
Jessica Cores debuted on TV in 2015, playing Lyris on Rede Globo's Verdades Secretas series. In 2017, she debuted on Portuguese TV in the series País Irmão of the channel RTP1. In 2019 she acted in the series The Stripper, in 2020 in the series "Imperial Brazil" of Amazon Prime and in 2021 she became protagonist of the series Invisible City of Netflix.

Filmography

References

External links
 

1990 births
Living people
21st-century Brazilian actresses
Afro-Brazilian actresses
Brazilian television actresses
Actors from Rio de Janeiro (state)
People from Magé
Afro-Brazilian female models
Adoptees